Golam Mabud (born 10 October 1984) is a Bangladeshi cricketer. He played in 79 first-class and 55 List A matches from 2001/02 to 2012/13. He was also part of the Dhaka Warriors' squad for the Indian Cricket League (ICL). After initially facing a ten-year ban by the Bangladesh Cricket Board (BCB) for joining the ICL, Mabud was one of thirteen players to end their relationship with the ICL in June 2009.

See also
 List of Prime Bank Cricket Club cricketers
 List of Sylhet Division cricketers

References

External links
 

1984 births
Living people
Bangladeshi cricketers
Sylhet Division cricketers
Prime Bank Cricket Club cricketers
Place of birth missing (living people)